Arthua is a panchayat (village) in Aurangabad district in the Indian state of Bihar.

Language 
The languages of Arthua are Hindi and Urdu and most of the villagers speak both.

Transportation 
The nearest railway station to Arthua is Rafiganj, located around 9.1 kilometer away. Other railway stations and their distance from Arthua are:
Arthua's nearest airport is Gaya International Airport located at a distance of 33.9 km away. Another airport around Arthua is Lok Nayak Jayaprakash Airport, 136.1 km removed from Arthua.

Education 
Schools in the Arthua area are:

Villages in Aurangabad district, Bihar

References